Giulio Bresci (born 19 November 1921 – 8 August 1998) was an Italian professional road racing cyclist.

Major results

1946
6th Giro d'Italia
1947
2nd Giro del Lazio
2nd Tour de Suisse
1st Stage 4
3rd Giro d'Italia
1st Stage 18
1948
1st Gran Premio Industria e Commercio di Prato
1st Stage 4 Tour de Romandie
2nd Tour de Suisse
1st Stage 2
7th Giro d'Italia
1949
7th Giro d'Italia
1951
2nd Gran Premio Industria e Commercio di Prato

References

Italian male cyclists
Italian Giro d'Italia stage winners
1998 deaths
1921 births
People from Prato
Sportspeople from the Province of Prato
Cyclists from Tuscany
Tour de Suisse stage winners